The 1956 All England Championships was a badminton tournament held at the Empress Hall, Earls Court, London, England, from 14 to 17 March 1956.

Final results

Both June White and Irish Cooley married and competed under their married names of June Timperley and Iris Rogers.

Results

Men's singles

Section 1

Section 2

Women's singles

Section 1

Section 2

References

All England Open Badminton Championships
All England Badminton Championships
All England Open Badminton Championships in London
All England Championships
All England Badminton Championships
All England Badminton Championships